Anjali Sivaraman (born 17 October 1997) is an Indian actress and singer known for starring in the Netflix film Cobalt Blue (2022) and series Class (2023).

Early life
Anjali is the daughter of Indian singer Chitra Iyer and Vinod Sivaraman, a veteran Indian Air Force pilot.

Career
After getting her start in television commercials, Sivaraman gained recognition through modeling for Sabyasachi and playing the lead role in Netflix's Class, an adaptation of Spanish series Elite.

Filmography

Films

Television

References 

1997 births
Living people
Indian models
Indian female models
Indian actresses